Imago Mundi, or in full Imago Mundi: International Journal for the History of Cartography, is a semiannual peer-reviewed academic journal about mapping, established in 1935 by Leo Bagrow. It covers the history of early maps, cartography, and map-related ideas. Articles are in English and have abstracts in French, German, Spanish, and English. Each volume also contains three reference sections (book reviews, bibliography, and chronicle) that provide a summary of current developments in the field.

References

Notes

External links
 

History journals
Geography journals
Cartography
Publications established in 1935
English-language journals
Taylor & Francis academic journals
Biannual journals